The women's doubles Tournament at the 2007 Banka Koper Slovenia Open took place between October 29 and November 4 on outdoor hard courts in Portorož, Slovenia. Lucie Hradecká and Renata Voráčová won the title, defeating Andreja Klepač and Elena Likhovtseva in the final.

Seeds

Draw

References
 Main Draw

Banka Koper Slovenia Open - Doubles
Banka Koper Slovenia Open